Tahkhana is a 1986 Bollywood horror film directed by Shyam Ramsay and Tulsi Ramsay. It is a tale about two sisters separated at birth and the search for a hidden treasure, which is guarded in a dungeon by a bloodthirsty monster.

The movie had music composed by Ajit Singh and songs sung by Asha Bhosle, Amit Kumar, Anuradha Paudwal and Sushma Shreshtha. It starred Hemant Birje, Aarti Surendranath and Kamran Rizvi in the lead roles, supported by Aarti Surendranath, Puneet Issar Imtiaz Khan, Sheetal, Priti Sapru, Trilok Kapoor, Amarnath Chatterji, Huma Khan, Rajindernath, Shamsuddin and others.

Plot
A dying Thakur Surjeet Singh bequeaths the entire estate to his son, Raghuvir, disowning the other, Dhurjan, the family's black sheep, who also indulges in black magic. The latter swears to use magical powers to usurp the estate, and even arranges the abduction of Raghuvir's daughters, Sapna and Aarti. Mangal and his men manage to apprehend Dhurjan, imprison him in a dungeon, and rescue Aarti. 

However, they are unable to locate Sapna, and Raghuvir is killed. Before dying, he informs Mangal that Sapna has one of two pieces of a locket around her neck, while the other is on Aarti's, and when joined together will reveal the location of a treasure buried in a dungeon. 20 years later, Aarti and her boyfriend, Vijay, along with several others, will attempt to unearth this treasure - not realizing that they not only face betrayal from one of their own, but will also release and fall prey to an ageless and indestructible entity.

Cast
Hemant Birje as Heera
Kamran Rizvi as Vijay
Aarti Gupta as Aarti
Preeti Sapru as Panna
Trilok Kapoor as Raghuveer Singh
Narendra Nath as Dhurjan
Puneet Issar as Anand
Imtiaz Khan as Shakaal
Rajendra Nath as cook Zabardast
Huma Khan as Reena
Shamshuddin as Ghost (Shaitaan)
Sheetal as Sapna
Rana Jung Bahadur as Shakaal's friend

Music
"Nazro Se Aaj Nazre Aur Dil Se Dil Milaye" - Sushma Sharestha, Anuradha Paudwal
"Khuli Sadak Par: - Amit Kumar, Dilraj Kaur
"Mai Hoon Pagal" - Asha Bhosle

External links 
 

1986 films
1980s Hindi-language films
1986 horror films
Indian horror films
Films scored by Ajit Singh